The Holmes-Shannon House is a Craftsman style home with Tudor influences.

History 
It was built in 1911 in the Victoria Park neighborhood of Los Angeles, California. Designed by Robert Farquhar Train and Robert Edmund Williams, the house was listed on the National Register of Historic Places in March 2008 based on its well-preserved Craftsman architecture. It is also listed as a Historic-Cultural Monument by the City of Los Angeles Cultural Heritage Commission, which described it as "a residential building designed in the Tudor-Craftsman style by a prominent firm and reflective of the development of Victoria Park".

The interior was used in 2012 in the fifth episode "Open House of Horrors" of the fourth season of the American sitcom Modern Family, while the exterior was shot at the Miller and Herriott House in Los Angeles.

See also
 National Register of Historic Places listings in Los Angeles
 List of Los Angeles Historic-Cultural Monuments in the Wilshire and Westlake areas
 Mid-City, Los Angeles, California

References

American Craftsman architecture in California
Los Angeles Historic-Cultural Monuments
Houses completed in 1911
Houses on the National Register of Historic Places in Los Angeles
Mid-City, Los Angeles